Kaozheng ("search for evidence"), alternatively called kaoju xue ("evidential scholarship") and Qian–Jia School, was a school and approach to study and research in the Qing dynasty of China from about 1600 to 1850. It was most prominent during the reign of the Qianlong Emperor and Jiaqing Emperor (hence the alternate name "Qian–Jia School"). The approach corresponds to the methods of modern textual criticism, and was sometimes associated with an empirical approach to scientific topics as well.

History and controversies 
Some of the most important first generation of Qing thinkers were Ming loyalists, at least in their hearts, including Gu Yanwu, Huang Zongxi, and Fang Yizhi. Partly in reaction to the presumed laxity and excess of the late Ming, they turned to Kaozheng, or evidential learning, which emphasized careful textual study and critical thinking.

Rather than regarding kaozheng as a local phenomenon of Jiangnan and Beijing areas, it has been proposed to view it as a general trend in development of Chinese scholarship in light of contribution of Cui Shu (1740–1816).

Towards the end of the Qing and in the early 20th century, reform scholars such Liang Qichao, Hu Shih and Gu Jiegang saw in kaozheng a step towards development of empirical mode of scholarship and science in China. Conversely, Carsun Chang and Xu Fuguan criticized kaozheng as intellectually sterile and politically dangerous.

While Yu Ying-shih in the late 20th century has tried to demonstrate continuity between kaozheng and neo-Confucianism in order to provide a non-revolutionary basis for Chinese culture, Benjamin Elman has argued that kaozheng constituted "an empirical revolution" that broke with the stance of neo-Confucian combination of teleological considerations with scholarship.

Influence in Japan
The methods of kaozheng were imported into Edo-era Japan as kōshō or kōshōgaku. This approach combined textual criticism and empiricism in an effort to find ancient, "original" meanings of texts. The earliest use of kaozheng methods in Edo Japan was Keichū's critical edition of the Man'yōshū. These methods were eventually used by the Kokugaku to argue that modern science was indigenous to Japan; they also contributed to the Kokugaku critique of Buddhism.

See also 
 Dai Zhen
 Changzhou School of Thought
 Han learning
 Kokugaku
 Textual criticism

Notes

Bibliography 
 
 Krebs, Edward S. 1998. Liu's prison essays. Chapter 4 of Shifu, Soul of Chinese Anarchism. Rowan & Littlefeld Publishers. 48-50 (at google books)
 Kenji, Shimada. Pioneer of the Chinese Revolution: Zhang Binglin and Confucianism. Translated by Joshua A. Fogel. 58-60 (at google books)
 .
 Quirin, Michael. "Scholarship, Value, Method, and Hermeneutics in Kaozheng: Some Reflections on Cui Shu (1740-1816) and the Confucian Classics". History and Theory 35.4:34-53. Available at www.academicroom.com, retrieved 18.5.2014.
 Spence, Jonathan D.  The Search for Modern China. 103-105 (at Google Books)

Confucian schools of thought
Qing dynasty culture
Cultural history of China
Philology